Rivera v Bane, Index No. 45305/92, refers to a case before the New York State Supreme Court of New York County that produced several rulings regarding the right of an individual to receive certain documents prior to a New York fair hearing.

Case history
It was filed as a class action in 1994.  Following trial, the court ordered the City to make public assistance files available before fair hearings when timely requested by an appellant.

See also
Welfare Management System
Rivera request

Further reading

References

New York Supreme Court cases